Parliamentary elections were held in the Federated States of Micronesia on 7 March 2023 to elect the fourteen members of the Congress: ten representatives of the districts, and four senators each representing one of the four states.

Context 
The elections of 2019 saw the re-election of the thirteen outgoing senators vying for a new term, including three elected unopposed in their constituencies. The then incumbent President, Peter Christian, however, was defeated as Pohnpei State Senator, leading to the indirect election of David Panuelo as president. The 2021 legislative election led to the reappointment of the ten outgoing deputies.

President Panuelo ran for re-election in 2023, but announced that this election would be his last. The Pacific Islands Forum sent an election observer team led by a senior officer from the Republic of Marshall Islands Electoral Administration.

Electoral system and politics 

The Federated States of Micronesia is a federal presidential republic. The president is both head of state and government. There are no political parties in the Federated States of Micronesia, so all candidates and elected members are independent.

The Congress has fourteen members. Four of them represent one of the four federated states, and are elected for a four-year term by universal suffrage and by the citizens of their respective states. The remaining ten are elected by citizens by single majority voting for two-year terms, from ten constituencies divided by population: five in the state of Chuuk, one in the state of Kosrae, three in the state of Pohnpei, and one in the state of Yap. After the legislative election, the President and Vice President are indirectly elected by Congress from among the Senators, for a maximum of two consecutive four-year terms. Their positions as Senators are filled by a new election.

Preliminary results

References 

Elections in the Federated States of Micronesia
Micronesia
Parliamentary election
Election and referendum articles with incomplete results
Non-partisan elections